Rarity Bay is a golf course community and census-designated place (CDP) in Loudon and Monroe counties, Tennessee, United States. It was first listed as a CDP prior to the 2020 census. its population during the census was 885. It is in the southern part of Loudon County and the northern part of Monroe County, occupying a peninsula in Tellico Reservoir, with the Little Tennessee River to the southeast and the cove of Bat Creek to the northwest. Tennessee State Route 72 runs along the western edge of the CDP, leading south  to U.S. Route 411 in Vonore and north  to Loudon.

Demographics

References 

Populated places in Loudon County, Tennessee
Census-designated places in Loudon County, Tennessee
Populated places in Monroe County, Tennessee
Census-designated places in Monroe County, Tennessee
Census-designated places in Tennessee
Tennessee Valley Authority

2